Louis Ray Henson (January 10, 1932 – July 25, 2020) was an American college basketball coach. He retired as the all-time leader in victories at the University of Illinois with 423 victories and New Mexico State with 289 victories. Overall, Henson won 779 games putting him in sixteenth place on the all-time list. Henson was also one of only four NCAA coaches to have amassed at least 200 total wins at two institutions. On February 17, 2015, Henson was selected as a member of the National Collegiate Basketball Hall of Fame. In August 2015, prior to the reopening of the newly renovated State Farm Center at the University of Illinois, the hardwood floor was dedicated and renamed Lou Henson Court in his honor. The court at the Pan American Center at New Mexico State University is also named in his honor.

Early life and education
Born in Okay, Oklahoma, Henson graduated from Okay High School in 1951 and matriculated at Connors Junior College before transferring to New Mexico College of Agriculture and Mechanic Arts (New Mexico A&M, now New Mexico State University). He lettered in basketball for the New Mexico A&M Aggies from 1953 to 1955 and graduated with a bachelor's degree in 1955 and master's degree in 1956.

Career
Henson began his coaching career at Las Cruces High School in Las Cruces, New Mexico  in 1956. After two years as junior varsity coach, Henson was head coach of the varsity team from 1958 to 1962 and won state championships in 1959, 1960, and 1961.

He started coaching in the college ranks in 1962 at Hardin-Simmons University. As a condition of taking the Hardin-Simmons job, Henson insisted that the team (and thus the school) be racially integrated, a condition to which the university agreed. In 1966, he took over at his alma mater, New Mexico State University. In his first season at NMSU, the Aggies rebounded from a 4–22 record in the prior season to finish 15–11 and went to the NCAA tournament. In 1970, Henson would help lead the Aggies to the Final Four for the only time in the school's history.  Henson and future NBA players Jimmy Collins, Sam Lacey, and Charlie Criss lost in the tournament semifinal to eventual champion UCLA, the third time in three years the Aggies lost to UCLA in the tournament.  Henson coached at New Mexico State for nine seasons, with six trips to the NCAA Tournament and four twenty-win seasons.

In 1975, Henson moved to the University of Illinois to replace Gene Bartow, after Bartow left Illinois to replace John Wooden at UCLA.   In 21 years at Illinois, Henson garnered 423 wins and 224 losses (.654 winning percentage), and with a record of 214 wins and 164 losses (.567) in Big Ten Conference games.  The 214 wins in Big Ten games were the third highest total ever at the time of his retirement.  His best Fighting Illini team was the 1988–89 unit, which won a then-school record 31 games and went to the Final Four. At Illinois, Henson coached many future NBA players, including Eddie Johnson, Derek Harper, Ken Norman, Nick Anderson, Kendall Gill, Kenny Battle, Marcus Liberty, Steve Bardo, and Kiwane Garris, and was known for his trademark Lou-Do. Henson retired from Illinois at the end of the 1996–1997 season.

In 1997, Henson returned to New Mexico State as interim head coach after Neil McCarthy was abruptly fired before the start of the season.  Henson wanted to donate his time, but was told that state law didn't allow him to coach for free.  He finally accepted a nominal salary of $1 per month.  After a successful season, he was given his old job back on a permanent basis.  His 1998–99 team won the Big West regular season and tournament titles—notably, the first time in Henson's career that he had won a conference tournament.  He retired for good midway through the 2004–05 season due to non-Hodgkin's lymphoma.  His second stint allowed him to regain his standing as New Mexico State's all-time winningest coach, passing McCarthy.

Health problems
In July 2007, Henson announced that he was again undergoing chemotherapy for the same strain of lymphoma that he had battled four years previously.  He was undergoing treatment in Champaign, Illinois, where he lived in the summer.  In July 2015, Henson once again entered chemotherapy for "bone marrow problems."

Henson "returned to coaching" at age 82 as coach of the New Mexico House of Representatives team in a charity contest versus the New Mexico State Senate team on February 7, 2014.

Henson died on July 25, 2020 at the age of 88.

Head coaching record

‡ New Mexico State  ineligible for conference championship
* Record vacated due to NCAA infractions
† Henson resigned on January 22, 2005 and was replaced that day by interim head coach Tony Stubblefield; their collective record in the 2004–05 season was 6–24 (1–14 Sun Belt) for a sixth-place finish in the Sun Belt West division.

See also
 List of college men's basketball coaches with 600 wins
 List of NCAA Division I Men's Final Four appearances by coach
 Lou Henson Award

References

External links
 New Mexico State profile (2004)

1932 births
2020 deaths
American men's basketball coaches
American men's basketball players
Basketball coaches from Oklahoma
Basketball players from Oklahoma
College men's basketball head coaches in the United States
Connors State Cowboys basketball players
Guards (basketball)
Hardin–Simmons Cowboys and Cowgirls athletic directors
Hardin–Simmons Cowboys basketball coaches
High school basketball coaches in the United States
Illinois Fighting Illini men's basketball coaches
New Mexico State Aggies athletic directors
New Mexico State Aggies men's basketball coaches
New Mexico State Aggies men's basketball players
People from Wagoner County, Oklahoma
Sportspeople from Las Cruces, New Mexico